The 2016–17 Welsh Football League Division One (known as the Nathaniel Cars Welsh Football League Division One for sponsorship reasons) was the 2016–17 season of the top football league in South Wales. Together with its North Wales counterpart, the Cymru Alliance, the 16-team division forms the second tier of the Welsh football league system, one level below the nationwide Welsh Premier League. The season began on 13 August 2016 and concluded on 6 May 2017.

On 18 April 2017, Barry Town United defeated Goytre United 3–0 to clinch promotion to the Welsh Premier League for the 2017–18 season.

Teams

Cardiff Metropolitan University were champions in the previous season and were promoted to the 2016–17 Welsh Premier League; they were replaced by Haverfordwest County and Port Talbot Town who were both relegated from the 2015–16 Welsh Premier League.

Aberbargoed Buds, Aberdare Town, Briton Ferry Llansawel and Garden Village were all relegated to 2016–17 Welsh Football League Division Two; they were replaced by Caldicot Town, Cwmbran Celtic and Undy Athletic who were all promoted from Division Two the previous season.

Stadia and locations

League table

Results

References

External links

2016–17 in Welsh football
Welsh Football League Division One seasons